The 47th ceremony of the People's Choice Awards was held on December 7, 2021, at the Barker Hangar in Santa Monica, California. Hosted by Kenan Thompson, the show was the first to be presented before an in-person audience since 2019. The television broadcast marked the first time the show was aired live simultaneously on both NBC and E! after airing solely on E! for the past three years, and on CBS prior to that.

In October, over 300 nominees spanning 40 entertainment categories across film, television, music, and pop culture were announced. F9: The Fast Saga and This Is Us were the most-nominated entries in the Film and Television categories respectively with eight and six nominations each. Justin Bieber led the Music nominations with 10 to his name. The most-awarded nominees of the night were BTS and Dwayne Johnson, who won three awards each: the former won Group, Song, and Music Video of 2021, while the latter won Male and Comedy Movie Star, and was additionally honored with the People's Champion Award, one of three Icon awards given on the night. Black Widow won Movie of 2021, while Loki won TV Show of 2021. Christina Aguilera was honored with the show's first-ever Music Icon Award, in recognition of her career and contributions to the music industry.

Performers 
Christina Aguilera was the first performer announced for the show on December 1, 2021. H.E.R. and Blake Shelton were announced as additional performers on December 6, with H.E.R. slated to perform a tribute to R&B singer Marvin Gaye in honor of his life and musical legacy. As the recipient of the inaugural Music Icon Award, Aguilera performed a medley of her most popular songs, including the single "Somos Nada" from her then-upcoming studio album Aguilera (2022). Backed by a group of violinists, the singer opened with a gothic-style rock rendition of "Genie in a Bottle" while wearing a "floor-length black ruffled gown". She then segued into selections from her Back to Basics (2006) and Stripped (2002) albums. Aguilera's performance featured three wardrobe changes, including a black and yellow leather outfit—reminiscent of the one she wore for MTV's TRL Presents: Christina Aguilera Stripped in NYC in 2002, and the original red version from the "Dirrty" music video—for her second segment, and a yellow dress for the finale.

Presenters 
Kenan Thompson was announced as the show's host in November. The full lineup of celebrity presenters was announced on December 6. Laverne Cox hosted the red carpet pre-show.

 Becky G – presented the Music Icon Award to Christina Aguilera
 Cardi B – presented the People's Icon Award to Halle Berry
 Jeff Bezos – presented the People's Champion Award to Dwayne Johnson
 Eliza Coupe, Ginnifer Goodwin, and Maggie Q – presented the award for Male TV Star of 2021
 Laverne Cox – introduced H.E.R.
 Mike Epps
 Paris Jackson – presented the award for Reality Show of 2021
 Leslie Jones – presented the award for Male Movie Star of 2021
 Lil Rel Howery
 Jack Quaid and Sydney Sweeney – presented the award for Country Artist of 2021
 Lili Reinhart
 Tracee Ellis Ross – presented the Fashion Icon Award to Kim Kardashian
 Jojo Siwa – presented the award for Daytime Talk Show of 2021
 Chase Stokes
 Wanda Sykes

Winners and nominees 
Nominations were announced on October 27, 2021. Voting opened that same day and took place on the PCAs website and Twitter until November 17. In the film categories, F9: The Fast Saga received eight nominations, while Black Widow and Coming 2 America garnered six each. For television, This Is Us led with six nominations across five categories while Grey's Anatomy, Law & Order: SVU, Loki, Outer Banks, Ted Lasso, and WandaVision tied with four apiece. Justin Bieber led the music categories with ten nominations, followed by Lil Nas X with six. Christina Aguilera received the inaugural Music Icon Award.

Winners are listed first and highlighted in bold. BTS and Dwayne Johnson won three awards each and were the most-awarded nominees of the night.

Film

TV

Music

Pop culture

Other 

Sources:

References 

December 2021 events in the United States
2021 awards in the United States
2021 film awards
2021 music awards
2021 television awards
2021 in Los Angeles County, California
People's Choice Awards